Rak Salai Dokfai Ban, is a song by Thai Mor lam singer Jintara Poonlarp, released in November 1998 by Master Tape (GMM Grammy). Written by Dao Bandon and produced by Sawat Sarakham, the track appears on the album Mor lam sa on 1.

This song is symbol of Red Cross's festival of Loei Province, and was covered by Darunee Sutthiphithak in 2017.

References

Jintara Poonlarp songs
1998 singles
1998 songs